L8R may refer to:

 L8R (band), a 2000s Norwegian band
 L8R or l8r, "later" in SMS language

See also
 L8r, g8r, a 2007 novel by Lauren Myracle
 Later (disambiguation)